Owen Finlay Maclaren, MBE (26 May 1906 – 13 April 1978) was the inventor of the lightweight baby buggy with a collapsible support assembly and founder of the Maclaren company.

Early life
He was born in Saffron Walden in Essex to Andrew Maclaren and Eva (née Friend). His father died in 1914. His family descended from the Clan MacLaren in Argyll. He attended Marlborough College and Blair Lodge Academy in Polmont, Falkirk. He studied at Jesus College, Cambridge, where he learnt to fly in Cambridge University Air Squadron, qualifying as a pilot in 1928.

Design engineer

Esso
He first worked for Esso.
Then he moved.

Spitfire undercarriage
He designed Spitfire undercarriage legs when working for Maclaren Undercarriage Company Ltd, and while living in West Drayton, Middlesex. In 1944, he retired from aeronautical design, forming the company Andrews Maclaren that manufactured aircraft components.

The Maclaren Drift Undercarriage
In 1937, he designed a system for an undercarriage that could cope with cross winds, in which the main wheels could be set to a steering angle away from straight ahead, so that an aircraft could be landed safely in a "crabbing" attitude. Tests with several aircraft types were conducted during and after World War II.

He designed the 'Maclaren Radiator' in 1943. It doubled the chances of an aircraft returning, if hit by a bullet.

Dunlop
After the war he helped to develop anti-skid (ABS) brakes (Maxaret) for the aircraft division of Dunlop in Coventry. He formed Andrews Maclaren Ltd with Bill Andrews.

Collapsible baby buggy
The former test pilot and designer of the Supermarine Spitfire undercarriage was inspired when his daughter visited from Moscow with his first grandchild (Anne Hambledon, born in 1962). His daughter had married George Hambledon of Pan Am, making many flights to London.  After watching the parents struggle with the clumsy conventional pushchair, he used his knowledge of lightweight, collapsible structures to create a new generation of infant transport and inspire the design of future collapsible objects such as the Strida bicycle.

He designed his first buggy in 1964, which was built in his medieval farmhouse stables in Barby, Northamptonshire in England just south of Rugby. He applied for a patent, on 20 July 1965, for his 6lb B01 prototype with lightweight aluminium tubes receiving Patent No. 1,154,362. On 18 July 1966 he filed for an American patent, receiving Patent No. 3,390,893A.

He then founded his company, the Maclaren Company, in 1965.

Only after this design would aluminium tubes be used in other household equipment. The buggy went on sale in 1967, and roughly a thousand of them were manufactured that year. In 1976 that number rose to 600,000 buggies produced a year.

He also designed the 'Gadabout folding chair' which was produced from 1961, and was commissioned by the Ministry of Health to design a larger folding buggy for larger children with disabilities called the 'Buggy Major' this buggy was designed on square tubes instead of the usual round tubes like the 'Baby Buggy', being produced around 1970.

Today the modern version of the 'Baby Buggy' are sold in over 50 countries under the Maclaren brand based in Long Buckby.

Personal life
He was married to Marie Blacklock, and they had a son (who married on 15 June 1963, then moved to Hatfield Peverel in Essex, having a son in March 1965 and a daughter in April 1968) and daughter (1937–90). His grand-daughter, Anne Hambledon, for whom the baby-buggy was designed, now lives in Vermont.

His eldest brother Bruce (who also attended the University of Cambridge) married the granddaughter of Charles George Arbuthnot, and also the niece of General Sir Alexander Cobbe VC.

In January 1978, Queen Elizabeth II awarded him with an MBE in the New Year's Honours List.

Notes

References
 R. Roy. (2004). Creativity and Concept Design. (p. 63). Open University Worldwide Ltd. .
 Rosalind Sharpe. (23 September 1995). Mother of invention. The Independent. Retrieved 2008-04-01.
 Annabel Freyberg. (2008). Design notebook: Baby buggy. The Telegraph.
 Per Mollerup. (2001). Collapsible: The Genius of Space-saving Design. (p. 114). Chronicle Books. .
 John Gapper. (19 September 2003). Wheels of fortune. FT.com. Retrieved 2008-04-01.

External links
 Presentation on Owen Finlay Maclaren and the history of the Maclaren company.
 His granddaughter sees his inventions at Duxford

Audio clips
 The Indispensables – narrated by Lynn Truss on Radio 4 in July 2004

Patents
 US Patent 2222850 Aircraft Undercarriage, dated 26 November 1940
 US Patent 2315901 Endless Track Element for Aircraft and Land Vehicles, dated April 1943
 US Patent 3124387 Seating structures, dated March 1964
 US Patent 3390893 Structures for Folding Baby-Carriages, Chairs, and the like, dated July 1968  
 US Patent 3736021 Folding Wheel Chair, dated May 1973
 US Patent 3968991 Collapsible Seat Structures, dated 13 July 1976
 US Patent D246518 Baby Carriage, dated 29 November 1977
 US Patent 4232897 Lie Back Buggy, dated 11 November 1980 (awarded posthumously)

Alumni of Jesus College, Cambridge
British company founders
British manufacturing chief executives
20th-century British businesspeople
20th-century British engineers
1906 births
1978 deaths
Members of the Order of the British Empire
People educated at Marlborough College
People from West Northamptonshire District
People from Saffron Walden
Supermarine Spitfire
Sustainable transport pioneers